Alexey Pchelintsev (born April 18, 1991 in Almaty) is a Kazakhstani ski jumper.

Pchelintsev competed at the 2014 Winter Olympics for Kazakhstan. He placed 46th both the normal hill qualifying round and the large hill qualifying round, failing to advance.

Pchelintsev made his World Cup debut in January 2012. As of September 2014, his best team finish is 10th, in a team event at Zakopane in 2013–14. His best individual finish is 53rd, at a ski flying event at Tauplitz in 2012.

References

1991 births
Living people
Olympic ski jumpers of Kazakhstan
Ski jumpers at the 2014 Winter Olympics
Sportspeople from Almaty
Kazakhstani male ski jumpers